Inventory is a list of goods and materials held available in stock by a business.

Inventory may also refer to:

Arts, entertainment, and media
 Inventory (artists), a group of British artists
 Inventory (film), a 1989 Polish drama film directed by Krzysztof Zanussi
 Inventory, item storage available to a character in a video game
 Inventory, in music, the first useful characteristic of a partition; the set classes produced by the union of the constituent pitch class sets of a partition
 Advertising inventory, space available for showing advertising

Assessments
 Moral inventory, self-examination by a member of a twelve-step program
 Strong Interest Inventory, a tool used in career assessment

Other uses
 Computer systems use inventories internally:
 Computer hardware inventories, lists of available components
 Data inventories, resembling repositories
 Software inventories, available code, not necessarily used
 A phonological inventory, the set of articulatory or manual gestures in a lect
 A consonant inventory, the set of consonants in a lect
 A vowel inventory, the set of vowels in a lect
 Naval Vessel Register (NVR), the official inventory of ships and service craft in custody of or titled by the U.S. Navy

See also
 
 
 Invent (disambiguation)
 Inventor (disambiguation)
 Storage (disambiguation)